Kvadrat is one of the largest shopping centres in Norway both by revenue and number of shops. The shopping centre is situated in Sandnes, Norway. Kvadrat Storsenter was opened in 1984 and contains 160 stores in several connected buildings totalling 84 912 m2.

External links 
Kvadrat Storsenter's homepage (in Norwegian)

Buildings and structures in Sandnes
Shopping centres in Norway